The kofia is a brimless cylindrical cap with a flat crown, worn mainly by some men in East Africa.

Description
The kofia is worn by Somali and Swahili men in East Africa, especially in Somalia, Kenya, Uganda, Tanzania, Malawi, and north and coast of Mozambique. It is also commonly worn in Oman. Kofia is a Swahili word that means "hat". The kofia is a round cap with no brim and a flat crown.

The kofia is worn with a dashiki, a colorful African shirt which is called a kitenge shirt in some regions of East Africa. In Uganda, the kofia is worn with the kanzu on informal occasions. Jomo Kenyatta, the first President of Kenya, was often photographed wearing a kofia. The kofia is popular in Comoros. The traditional kofia has tiny pin holes in the cloth that allows the air to circulate.

Related headwear

Bargashia
In Zanzibar, and Northern Uganda, the Bargashia is a popular hat. This hat was named after Barghash bin Said of Zanzibar, the former Sultan of Zanzibar. Unlike the kofia, it is covered in embroidery and does not have pin holes. Like the kofia, the bargashia is worn with the kanzu.

Fez

The fez is also worn with the kanzu and dashiki in East Africa. The East African style has a tassel that hangs from the top of the hat. The red fez was introduced into the region by the military. During British colonial rule of East Africa, the red fez was worn by a regiment called the King's African Rifles. The fez is also worn in West Africa, but the West African version has a stem on top of the hat, and no tassel.

The Cape Malays in Cape Town, South Africa, whose menfolk wear fezzes, sometimes refer to the fez as a kofia (also spelt kofija).

See also
 Kufi - cap worn in West Africa
 Kanzu - tunic worn with the kofia cap in East Africa
 Kopiah - cap worn in Indonesia

References

African clothing
Swahili culture
Swahili words and phrases
Hats